Enzo Tedeschi (born 26 November 1976) is an Australian producer, screenwriter, screen editor and director. Best known for producing the crowdfunded and BitTorrent released The Tunnel, Tedeschi went on to create and produce several international award-winning web series including Event Zero and Airlock, feature horror anthology A Night of Horror Volume 1, and two instalments of the Skinford franchise created by Nik Kacevski. 2017 saw the theatrical release of his directorial debut feature film Event Zero, a reboot of his award-winning 2012 web series.

Career 

During Tedeschi's early career, he was an editor and supervising editor, working on lifestyle programs such as the Australian adventure-travel series Getaway and Things To Try Before You Die, as well as the ASTRA Award winning children's program, Gardening for Kids with Madi, and producer and editor of the feature-length documentaries, Food Matters, Hungry For Change and The Crossing.

As a producer, he has worked with directors including Shane Abbess (Gabriel, Infini, The Osiris Child), Carlo Ledesma (The Last One, The Tunnel, Hawa), Andrew Traucki (The Reef, Black Water) and Nik Kacevski (Skinford).

In 2010, Enzo teamed up with fellow producer Julian Harvey to form Distracted Media. The first project for that production company, crowd-funded horror/thriller film The Tunnel, was in limited theatrical release as well as being available on DVD, TV and through BitTorrent online downloading platforms on 18 May 2011, simultaneously. The film was directed by Carlo Ledesma and co-written, co-produced and co-edited by Julian Harvey and Enzo Tedeschi.

Following up from The Tunnel, Distracted Media then produced Event Zero, a multiple award-winning web series focused around the aftermath of a train derailment and biological terror attack in Sydney's underground rail system. Produced for Movie Extra's YouTube channel in the final months of the channel, the series failed to reach the same size audience as The Tunnel, despite being received well critically and winning several international awards.

Airlock was the final project produced for Distracted Media. A science fiction web series with a budget more or less unheard of in the web series space at the time, it created much more buzz than Event Zero due to its ambitious sets and attempt at looking like a 'big-budget' sci-fi.

Enzo then went on to found Deadhouse Films in 2015, an Australian company looking to specialise in genre production and distribution. In its first 3 years, the company produced a first instalment of the horror franchise A Night of Horror Volume 1, several shorts, and through the Deadrock co-production venture with French production company and sales agency Rockzeline, also produced Skinford, Skinford Chapter Two, Pet Killer and a feature-length reboot of Event Zero.

In 2021, horror streaming platform released the Shudder Original Series Deadhouse Dark, a six-part anthology web series on which Tedeschi was Showrunner, directing one episode, and writing two.

Filmography

References

External links

Official Website - www.enzotedeschi.com.au
Deadhouse Films Official Website - www.deadhousefilms.com

1976 births
Australian film editors
Australian film producers
Australian television producers
Living people
Australian screenwriters